Diarra is a French translation of the clan name Jara used in West Africa, as a hangover from the French colonial empire in that region. It originates from the Bambara language word jara, meaning lion, synonymous with waraba. It is frequently used with reference to the 18th to early 19th-century Bambara Empire in Ségou, Mali, which was ruled successively by Ngolo Diarra, his son Mansong (or Monzon) Diarra, and then his son Da Diarra.

The clan name (or patronym) Jara/Diarra is related to another clan name, Koné, and is heard in many of the chronicles that have been handed down orally.  Both are frequently praised together in song, signifying bravery and fearlessness.

The name Diarra, now a surname, is traditionally found mostly in Mali, but  also Burkina Faso, Côte d'Ivoire, Guinea and Senegal. Today, it has also spread around the world, notably in France and Spain. Today, it is also used as a given name.

Diarra may refer to:

Surname
Abdel Diarra (full name Abdel Rahamane Diarra Khalil; born 1994), Ivorian footballer
Abdoulaye Diarra (born 1987), Ivorian footballer
Abdoulaye Diarra (footballer, born 1994), Malian international footballer who plays for Maghreb de Fès 
Aboubacar Diarra  (born 1993), Malian footballer, played in Egypt
Adama Traoré Diarra (born 1996), known as Adama, Spanish footballer, plays for Wolverhampton, brother of Mohamed Traoré Diarra
Ali Diarra (born 1988), Ivorian footballer 
Alou Diarra (born 1981), French international footballer, World Cup 2006 player
Alpha Mandé Diarra (born 1954), Malian author
Arouna Diarra, member of the American folk musical group Rising Appalachia
Binta Diarra (born 1994), Malian footballer, plays for the national women's team
Boubacar Diarra (disambiguation), several people, including:
Boubacar Diarra (footballer, born 1979) (born 1979), retired Malian footballer
 Boubacar Diarra (footballer, born 1994), current footballer who plays for Neroca F.C.
Boubakary Diarra (born 1993), French-born footballer who has represented Mali at youth level
Brahima Diarra (born 2003), French footballer, plays for Huddersfield Town
Cartier Diarra (born 1998), American basketball player
Cheick Diarra (disambiguation), several people
Cheikh-Alan Diarra (born 1993), French professional footballer
Diadié Diarra (born 1991), French footballer
Djigui Diarra (born 1995), Malian footballer who plays for Tanzanian club Young Africans
 Dramane Diarra (born 1980), French basketball player 
Drissa Diarra (disambiguation), several people 
Elea-Mariama Diarra (born 1990), French athlete
Fatim Diarra (born 1986), Finnish politician
Fatoumata Diarra (disambiguation), several people
Habib Diarra (born 2004), Senegalese footballer, plays for Strasbourg, France
Harouna Diarra (born 1978), Malian former footballer, played in Crete
Hélène Diarra  (1955–2021), Malian actress
Ibrahima Diarra (born 1971) is a Burkinabé former professional footballer 
Ichaka Diarra (born 1995), Malian footballer, plays for Lebanese club Ansar 
Ismaïla Diarra (born 1992), Malian footballer
Jean-Gabriel Diarra (1945–2019), Malian Roman Catholic bishop
Kadidia Diarra (born 1994), Malian footballer, former member of the Mali women's national team
Lamine Diarra (born 1983), Senegalese football player
Laré Mohamed Diarra, Burkina Faso international footballer
Lassana Diarra (born 1985), French international footballer
Lassana Diarra (Malian footballer) (born 1989), Malian footballer, plays for Djoliba AC
Lassina Diarra, Malian footballer, plays for AS Bakaridjan
Mahamadou Diarra (born 1981), Malian international footballer
Maimouna Diarra (born 1991), Senegalese basketball player
Mamadou Diarra (disambiguation), several people
Mamady Diarra (born 2000), Malian footballer
Mansong Diarra (aka Monzon), ruler of the Bambara Empire from 1795 to 1808; son of Ngolo Diarra
Mariatou Diarra (born 1985), Malian women's basketball player
M'Bam Diatigui Diarra (1946–2011), Malian lawyer and human rights activist
Mohamadou Diarra (born 1983), Senegalese rugby union player
Mohamed Traoré Diarra, Spanish footballer known as Moha Traoré, brother of Adama
Mohammed Diarra (born 1992), Guinean international footballer
Moké Diarra (born 1983), Malian former professional footballer
Moussa Diarra (disambiguation), several people
Moustapha Diarra (born 1987), French basketball player
Nakunte Diarra (born c. 1941), Malian textile artist
Ngolo Diarra, king of the Bambara Empire from 1766 to 1795; father of Mansong Diarra
Nianta Diarra (born 1993), Malian professional basketball player
Oumou Armand Diarra, pseudonym of Malian writer Oumou Modibo Sangare
Ousmane Diarra (disambiguation), several people
Raphaël Diarra (born 1995), French professional footballer
Salimata Diarra (born 1994), Malian international footballer, plays for the Mali women's national team 
Sekou Diarra (born 1993), Malian international footballer, plays for Onze Créateurs
Seydina Diarra (born 1994), Belgian-Malian footballer
Seydou Diarra (1933–2020), Prime Minister of Côte d'Ivoire
Seydou Diarra (footballer) (born 1968), Ivorian former footballer
Sidiki Diarra (1952–2014), former Burkinabé footballer, later manager of Burkina Faso national team 
Sigamary Diarra (born 1984), retired Malian footballer 
Souleymane Diarra (born 1995), Malian footballer
Stéphane Diarra (born 1998), Ivorian footballer
 Tapha Diarra (Moustafa "Tapha" Diarra; born 1970), a Senegalese sprinter
Yacouba Diarra (born 1988), a Malian footballer
Youba Diarra (born 1998), Malian footballer, plays for Red Bull Salzburg

Given name
Diarra Sylla (born 30 January 2001), also known simply a Diarra, a French-Senegalese singer
Diarra Kilpatrick, American actress
Diarra Traoré (1935–1985), Guinean soldier and politician
 Liya Ag Ablil, aka Diarra, founding member of Mali Tuareg band Tinariwen
Mame Diarra Bousso (1833–1866), Sufi saint from Senegal

References